Candle is a single by the band Skinny Puppy, taken from their 1996 album The Process. The song was atypical of the band's normal output in that it was built around acoustic guitar.

Track listing

Personnel
Nivek Ogre (vocals)
cEvin Key (production, various instruments)
Dwayne Goettel (various instruments, mixing)
Dave Ogilvie (production, mixing)
Ken Marshall (recording, mixing)

Charts

References

Further reading

External links
Candle at Discogs (CD, Maxi-Single, Promo, U.S.)

1996 singles
Skinny Puppy songs
1996 songs
American Recordings (record label) singles
Songs written by cEvin Key
Songs written by Dwayne Goettel
Songs written by Dave Ogilvie
Songs written by Nivek Ogre